This is a list of some converts to Islam from Hinduism.

References

Islam from Hinduism

Hinduism-related lists